Giuliano e i Notturni were an Italian pop group, active in the late 1960s.
 
The group was specialized in the bubblegum pop genre. They got their major hit with "Il ballo di Simone", a cover of the 1910 Fruitgum Company's song "Simon Says", which peaked at the third place on the Italian hit parade and became an instant classic.

Discography
Album 
 
     1968 - Giuliano e i Notturni (Ri-Fi, RFL-ST 14032)

Singles 
     1968 -  "Il ballo di Simone" (Ri-Fi, RFN-NP 16257)
     1968 -  "La giostra della felicità" (Ri-Fi, RFN-NP 16323)
     1969 -  "Ragazzina ragazzina" (Ri-Fi, RFN-NP 16351)
     1969 -  "E sono solo" (Ri-Fi, STP-NP 92002/3)

References

External links 

 

 
 
   
Italian pop music groups